The 2022 Grand Prix of Portland was the sixteenth And penultimate round of the 2022 IndyCar season. The race was held on September 4, 2022, in Portland, Oregon at the Portland International Raceway. The race consisted of 110 laps and was won by Scott McLaughlin.

Entry list

Practice

Practice 1

Practice 2

Qualifying

Qualifying classification 

 Notes
 Bold text indicates fastest time set in session.

Final Practice

Race 
The race started at 3:30 PM ET on September 4, 2022.

Race classification 

Cautions: 1 for 4 laps

Lead Changes: 9

Championship standings after the race 

Drivers' Championship standings

Engine manufacturer standings

 Note: Only the top five positions are included.

Footnotes

References

Grand Prix of Portland
Grand Prix of Portland
Grand Prix of Portland
Grand Prix of Portland
Grand Prix of Portland